(also written 2014 MV67) was a lost asteroid with an observation arc less than 1 day. It had an assumed orbital eccentricity and a very poorly constrained orbit. It was recovered by Pan-STARRS in September 2021 and is now known to be a Mars-crossing asteroid.

Description 
Main belts asteroids can have perihelia (closest approach to the Sun) as low as 1.7 AU. The 22 March 2022 impact scenario was 87,000 times lower than the background threat generated by unknown asteroids. It was removed from the Sentry Risk Table on 15 April 2021 when JPL transitioned to planetary ephemeris DE441.

It was discovered on 24 June 2014, when the asteroid was estimated to be  from Earth and had a solar elongation of 161 degrees.

The 22 March 2018 and 3 April 2019 virtual impactors did not occur. The uncertainty region of  wraps around the entire orbit so the asteroid could be anywhere on any of the numerous orbit fits. It could be near aphelion (in the asteroid belt) ~3 AU from the Sun. The asteroid was not expected to be near Earth anytime during 2019.

With an almost meaningless 1-day observation arc, the Sentry Risk Table showed an estimated 1 in 3 billion chance of the asteroid impacting Earth on 22 March 2022, which was 87,000 times lower than the background threat. And again it is not expected to be near Earth anytime during 2022.

See also

Notes

References

External links 
 
 
 

Mars-crossing asteroids
Minor planet object articles (unnumbered)

Near-Earth objects removed from the Sentry Risk Table
20140624